Marcellino van der Leeuw (born 15 June 1990 in Rotterdam) is a Dutch footballer who played for club Sparta Rotterdam during the 2009-2011 football seasons.

References

External links
voetbal international profile

Dutch footballers
Footballers from Rotterdam
Sparta Rotterdam players
Eredivisie players
Eerste Divisie players
1990 births
Living people
Association football forwards